Ours Is the Kingdom is the fourth album by English metal band Forefather. Its title is a play on the line of the Lord's Prayer "For thine is the kingdom, the power and the glory". The lyrics of the track are a statement against Christianity and a defiant will to reclaim the English kingdom from an alien God. The cover art depicts a dead crusader warrior, an image meant to symbolize Christian decay.

"Our hearts lie not in heaven,
Nor Eastern desert sands."

Track listing
"The Shield-Wall" – 4:10
"Ours Is the Kingdom" – 4:53
"Proud to be Proud" – 4:54
"The Golden Dragon" – 5:26
"Smashed by Fate" – 4:25
"The Sea-Kings" – 4:28
"To the Mountains They Fled" – 4:37
"The Folk That Time Forgot" – 4:55
"Threads of Time" – 6:18
"Keep Marching On" – 6:01
"Rebel of the Marshlands" – 4:03
"Wudugast" – 6:24''

2004 albums
Forefather albums